This is a list of college athletics programs in the U.S. state of South Carolina.

NCAA

Division I

Division II

Division III

NAIA

NJCAA

NCCAA

USCAA

See also 
List of NCAA Division I institutions
List of NCAA Division II institutions
List of NCAA Division III institutions
List of NAIA institutions
List of USCAA institutions
List of NCCAA institutions

South Carolina
College athletic programs
College sports in South Carolina
College athletic programs